In Nazi ideology, the race-soul, race soul or racial soul is a mystical racial psyche greater than any individual member of the German race. The race-soul was variously believed to be the source of such things as justice and poetry; non-Aryan and mixed races were believed to lack these qualities.

References

See also
Alfred Rosenberg

Volksgeist

Nazism